The Chemical Institute of Canada is a Canadian professional umbrella organization for researchers and professionals in the field of chemistry. It was founded in 1921 as the Canadian Institute of Chemistry until it merged with other groups in 1945 under its current name. The organisation comprises three groups: the Canadian Society for Chemical Engineering (est. 1966), the Canadian Society for Chemical Technology (est. 1973), and the Canadian Society for Chemistry (est. 1985).

Its highest award is the Chemical Institute of Canada Medal, awarded annually since 1951.

As of 2012, the Chemical Institute of Canada formed an agreement with the Society of Chemical Industry and SCI Canada, whereby SCI Canada became a forum of the CIC.

Canadian Chemistry Conference and Exhibition

Every year, the Chemical Institute of Canada holds a conference to bring together researchers and professional from all over Canada. The first conference in 1918 is said to have consisted of only 100 people and lead to the formation of the Chemical Society of Canada. In 2017, the 100th conference was held in Toronto coinciding with the 150th anniversary of Canada.

Fellows
The Chemical Institute of Canada awards fellowships (post-nominal FCIC) and honorary fellowships (post-nominal HFCIC).
 Robert Ackman, FCIC
 Alfred Bader, HFCIC
 Howard Charles Clark, FCIC
 Masad Damha, FCIC
 John R. Dunn, FCIC
 John Charles Polanyi, HFCIC
 William George Schneider, FCIC

References

External links
 
 Complete list of fellowships

Chemistry societies
Scientific organizations based in Canada